The 1985 World Junior Figure Skating Championships were held on December 11–16, 1984 in Colorado Springs, Colorado, United States. The event was sanctioned by the International Skating Union and open to ISU member nations. Medals were awarded in the disciplines of men's singles, ladies' singles, pair skating, and ice dancing.

Results

Men

Ladies

Pairs

Ice dancing

References

World Junior Figure Skating Championships
1984 in figure skating
1985 in figure skating
International figure skating competitions hosted by the United States